Skive or skiving may refer to:

 Skive, Denmark, a place in Denmark
 Skive Municipality
 Skive Airport
 Skive railway station
 Skive fH, a handball club
 Skive IK, a football club
 Skive RC, a rugby club
 Skiving (leathercraft), the thinning of a piece of leather using a sharp tool
 Skiving (metalworking), the process of cutting material off in slices
 Skiving off, a British term for slacking or truancy

See also 
 Skiving machine, to cut material off in slices, usually metal, but also leather or laminates